Ben Hermans (born 8 June 1986) is a Belgian professional road racing cyclist, who currently rides for UCI WorldTeam .

Career

In April 2015, he won the Belgian classic Brabantse Pijl with a late attack and resisted to the return of the peloton by a few seconds to cross the line solo. A couple of weeks later, he went on to win the third stage of the Tour de Yorkshire in solo fashion, attacking the leading group with twelve kilometers remaining. He also finished sixth overall in the race.
In 2017 he won the Tour of Oman. In August 2020, he was named in the startlist for the 2020 Tour de France.

Major results

2004
 1st  Time trial, National Junior Road Championships
 3rd Overall Giro della Lunigiana
 7th Road race, UCI Junior Road World Championships
2006
 2nd Overall Ronde de l'Isard
 4th Liège–Bastogne–Liège Espoirs
 7th Overall Tour des Pyrénées
2007
 10th Overall Circuit des Ardennes
 10th Liège–Bastogne–Liège Espoirs
2008
 1st Circuit de Wallonie
 1st Grand Prix des Marbriers
 2nd Time trial, National Under-23 Road Championships
 6th Chrono des Nations Espoirs
2009
 2nd Grand Prix of Aargau Canton
 6th Grand Prix d'Ouverture La Marseillaise
 7th Overall Settimana Ciclistica Lombarda
 9th De Vlaamse Pijl
2010
 6th Overall Tour of Belgium
1st Stage 5
 9th Overall Critérium International
 9th Overall Tour of Austria
2011
 1st Trofeo Inca
 2nd Time trial, National Road Championships
 3rd Overall Tour de Wallonie
 3rd Grand Prix Pino Cerami
 6th Overall Giro di Sardegna
 6th Binche–Tournai–Binche
 8th Amstel Gold Race
 9th Overall Eneco Tour
2012
 2nd Time trial, National Road Championships
 10th Overall Tour du Poitou-Charentes
 10th Paris–Bourges
2013
 5th Overall Tour Down Under
2014
 4th Overall Tour of Utah
 7th GP Ouest–France
 9th Overall Tour Méditerranéen
 9th Overall USA Pro Cycling Challenge
2015
 1st Brabantse Pijl
 2nd Overall Tour of Austria
 3rd Overall Tour de Pologne
 6th Overall Tour de Yorkshire
1st Stage 3
 8th Overall Tour of Oman
 9th Overall Arctic Race of Norway
1st Stage 3
2016
 2nd Overall Vuelta a Burgos
 3rd Time trial, National Road Championships
 5th Vuelta a Murcia
 7th Overall Abu Dhabi Tour
2017
 1st  Overall Tour of Oman
1st Stages 2 & 5
 1st Stage 2 (TTT) Volta a Catalunya
 2nd Overall Volta a la Comunitat Valenciana
1st Stage 1 (TTT)
 3rd Time trial, National Road Championships
 5th Overall Tour of Guangxi
 10th Giro dell'Emilia
2018
 1st  Overall Tour of Austria
1st Stage 3
 2nd Overall Tour of Utah
 4th Overall Okolo Slovenska
 9th Trofeo Laigueglia
2019
 1st  Overall Tour of Utah
1st Stages 2 & 3
 1st  Overall Tour of Austria
1st Stage 4
 2nd Overall Adriatica Ionica Race
1st  Mountains classification
 3rd Volta Limburg Classic
 8th Overall Tour of Slovenia
2020
 7th Overall Vuelta a Burgos
 9th Giro di Lombardia
2021
 1st  Overall Arctic Race of Norway
1st Stage 3
 1st Giro dell'Appennino
 1st Stage 4 (ITT) Tour Poitou-Charentes en Nouvelle-Aquitaine
 2nd Overall Tour de Hongrie
 3rd Gran Premio di Lugano
 6th Overall Settimana Internazionale di Coppi e Bartali
1st Stage 1b (TTT)
 8th Road race, UEC European Road Championships
 8th Overall Settimana Ciclistica Italiana
 9th Giro dell'Emilia

Grand Tour general classification results timeline

References

External links

 
 
 

Belgian male cyclists
Living people
1986 births
Sportspeople from Hasselt
Cyclists from Limburg (Belgium)